Krzysztof Boguszewski of Clan Ostoja (died 1635) was a Polish Baroque painter.

He was son of August and raised in Chełmno County, by a family that was part of Clan of Ostoja. In early years Krzysztof mastered his skills in Gdańsk under the supervision of Herman Han. Then in 1623 he was appointed painter by king Sigismund III Vasa to work for the Crown. Between 1627 and 1631 he worked on paintings showing the Battle of Grunwald in the Town Hall of Gdańsk. In 1628 he worked in the Abbacy of Gościkowo-Paradyż instructed by Abbot Marek Łętowski. There he produced four paintings of which of St. Paul remained in the Abbacy and the others like St. Martin of Tours were moved to the Poznań Cathedral.

He became priest in St Adalbert's (Wojciech) Church in Poznań in 1631 where he also found his final resting place in 1635. In the church he painted a picture of a Guarding angel and founded the altar.

References

References

 Wielkopolski słownik biograficzny (Greater Poland biography dictionary), Warszawa - Poznań 1981, PWN 
 Bogna Wrońska, Wjazd św.Marcina do Amiens z poznańskiej katedry, KMP 2005 2, Wydawnictwo Miejskie, Poznań 2005, ISSN 0137-3552
 Zofia Kurzawa, Andrzej Kusztelski,Historyczne kościoły Poznania. Przewodnik, Księgarnia Św. Wojciecha, Poznań 2006,

See also 

 Ostoja coat of arms
 Clan of Ostoja

17th-century Polish painters
Polish male painters
Clan of Ostoja
17th-century Polish nobility
1635 deaths
Year of birth missing
Catholic painters